Scratch and Bite is the Debut studio album by the Swedish heavy metal band Treat. It was released on February 24, 1985

Track listing

"Changes" - 3:41
"Scratch and Bite" - 4:13
"Get You on the Run" - 5:26
"Hidin'" - 4:49
"Too Wild" - 3:31
"We Are One" - 6:32
"No Room for Strangers" - 4:35
"You Got Me" - 4:46
"Run With the Fire" - 3:45

Personnel 
Robert Ernlund – vocals
Anders Wikstrom – guitars, keyboards, background vocals
Leif "Lillen" Liljegren – guitars, background vocals
Ken "Siwan" Siewertson – bass
Mats "Dalton" Dahlberg – drums

References 

1985 debut albums
Treat (band) albums
Mercury Records albums